Kenneth Hall, Sr. (May 20, 1915 – March 21, 1995) was an American politician.

Biography
Hall was born in East St. Louis, Illinois. He went to Parks College in Cahokia, Illinois. Hall served in the Illinois House of Representatives from 1967 to 1971 and was a Democrat. He then serve in the Illinois Senate from 1971 until his death in 1995. Hall was the first African-American to serve as assistant majority leader in the Illinois Senate. Hall died from pneumonia at the Saint Louis University Hospital in St. Louis, Missouri.

Notes

1915 births
1995 deaths
People from East St. Louis, Illinois
Saint Louis University alumni
African-American state legislators in Illinois
Democratic Party members of the Illinois House of Representatives
Democratic Party Illinois state senators
Deaths from pneumonia in Illinois
20th-century American politicians
20th-century African-American politicians
African-American men in politics